Don Hertzfeldt (born August 1, 1976) is an American animator, writer, and independent filmmaker. He is a two-time Academy Award nominee who is best known for the animated films It's Such a Beautiful Day, the World of Tomorrow series, and Rejected. In 2014, his work appeared on The Simpsons. Eight of his short films have competed at the Sundance Film Festival, a festival record. He is also the only filmmaker to have won the Sundance Film Festival's Grand Jury Prize for Short Film twice.

Hertzfeldt's work has been described as "some of the most influential animation ever created", "some of the most vital and expressive animation of the millennium", and "some of the most essential short films of the last 20 years". In 2020, GQ described his work as "simultaneously tragic and hilarious and philosophical and crude and deeply sad and fatalist and yet stubbornly, resolutely hopeful."

In his book The World History of Animation, author Stephen Cavalier writes "Hertzfeldt is either a unique phenomenon or perhaps an example of a new way forward for individual animators surviving independently on their own terms... he attracts the kind of fanatical support from the student and alternative crowds usually associated with indie rock bands".

Hertzfeldt's feature film It's Such a Beautiful Day was listed by many film critics as one of the best films of 2012 and the L.A. Film Critics Association named it runner-up for Best Animated Feature Film of the year. After a limited UK release in 2013, the film was ranked #3 on Time Out London's list of the 10 Best Films of 2013 and #4 on The London Film Review's list of the same. In 2014, Time Out New York ranked It's Such a Beautiful Day #16 on its list of the "100 Best Animated Movies Ever Made," and in 2016, The Film Stage critics ranked the film #1 on their list of "The 50 Best Animated Films of the 21st Century Thus Far." In 2019, The Wrap named It's Such a Beautiful Day the #1 "Best Animated Film of the 2010s." The same year, the Vulture film critics ranked it #12 on their overall list of the "Best Movies of the Decade."

In 2016, Rolling Stone ranked World of Tomorrow #10 on its list of the "40 Greatest Animated Movies Ever". Despite its short running time, The A.V. Club called it "possibly the best film of 2015." In 2019, Indiewire ranked World of Tomorrow #17 in its overall list of the "100 Best Movies of the Decade". In 2020, Indiewire called it "one of the greatest short films in the history of movies."

World of Tomorrow Episode Two: The Burden of Other People's Thoughts premiered in 2017 and received rare "A+" reviews from Indiewire and Collider, where it was described as "another soulful sci-fi masterpiece." The Daily Beast called it "a must-see animated masterpiece" and "one of the best films of the year."

Hertzfeldt's latest animated short film, World of Tomorrow Episode Three: The Absent Destinations of David Prime was released in 2020 to more positive reviews, including another "A+" from Indiewire. Of the "dreamy, beloved" ongoing series, The Film Stage noted, "Hertzfeldt has crafted what might be the crowning achievement of modern science fiction."

Hertzfeldt primarily supports his work through self-distribution such as ticket sales from theatrical tours, DVDs, VOD, and television broadcasts. He has refused all advertising work.

Hertzfeldt lives in Austin, Texas. He spent many years in Santa Barbara, California after attending college there.

Early life
Hertzfeldt was born on August 1, 1976, in Fremont, California, the son of an airline pilot and a county library clerk. Some publications have his place of birth as Fremont, California while others name the smaller Castro Valley, California. He is of half Swedish descent. Hertzfeldt attended Mission San Jose High School in Fremont. In his childhood, Hertzfeldt drew homemade comic books and, at the age of 15, he began to teach himself animation with a VHS video camera. Two of Hertzfeldt's teenage VHS cartoons can be seen on the "Bitter Films: Volume 1" DVD collection.

While at film school, Hertzfeldt was drawn to animation as it was a less expensive form to work in. He could not afford to buy the numerous rolls of 16 mm film required to shoot live action. He has stated, "I think I've always approached animation from a strange angle, a bit like a live action filmmaker who just happens to draw. Editing, writing, sound—those are the things that usually come first in my head. Animation is often just the busy work I need to get through to connect the dots and tell the story."

Hertzfeldt has never held a job other than creating his animated films. His earliest teenage video animations found film festival exposure, and in film school at the University of California, Santa Barbara he was able to find international distribution for each of his 16mm student films. He is a 1998 graduate with a B.A. in Film Studies.

Hertzfeldt's influences include Steven Spielberg, Stanley Kubrick, David Lynch, Edward Gorey, Monty Python, Stan Brakhage, silent films, and the animated shorts he saw at numerous animation festivals at a young age, including the early works of Aardman Animation and Bill Plympton.

In 2022, for the BFI Sight and Sound "Greatest Films of All Time" poll, Hertzfeldt listed the following ten films as important titles that had "knocked me over the head at some point in life and continue to do so": The Act of Killing, Citizen Kane, Close Encounters of the Third Kind, Gates of Heaven, The Godfather, Goodfellas, Harold and Maude, Monty Python's Life of Brian, The Pianist, and 2001: A Space Odyssey.

Technique
Hertzfeldt's work commonly features hand-drawn stick figures, in stories of black humor, surrealism, and tragicomedy. Some films contain existential and philosophical themes while others are more straightforwardly slapstick and absurdist. His animation was first created traditionally, with pen and paper, before transitioning to digital animation for his World of Tomorrow short film series. Hertzfeldt initially used antique 16 mm or 35 mm–film cameras to photograph his drawings and often employs old-fashioned special effect techniques such as multiple exposures, in-camera mattes, and experimental photography. While some of these techniques are as established as an occasional stop-motion animation sequence or a universe of moving stars created by back-lit pin holes, other effects are new innovations on classical methods, as seen with the in-camera compositing of multiple, split-screen windows of action in the Everything Will Be OK films.

Hertzfeldt's student films in the 1990s were photographed on 16mm. From 1999 to 2011, Hertzfeldt photographed his films on a 35mm Richardson animation camera stand, believed to be the same camera that photographed many of the Peanuts cartoons in the 1960s and 1970s. Built in the late 1940s, it was reportedly one of the last remaining functioning cameras of its kind left in the world, and Hertzfeldt found it to be a crucial element in the creation of his films and their unique visuals.

In 2015, Hertzfeldt released his first digitally animated short film, World of Tomorrow, which was created at the same time as another digital piece, an animated guest appearance on The Simpsons. Both pieces were still hand-drawn by Hertzfeldt, but he used a Cintiq tablet instead of paper.

Discussing film and digital technology with The New York Times in 2008, Hertzfeldt noted:

It's not unusual for Hertzfeldt to write, direct, produce, animate, photograph, edit, perform voices, record and mix sound, and/or compose music for one of his films, at times requiring years to complete a single short by working alone. The animation for one of his films may often require tens of thousands of drawings.

Hertzfeldt frequently scores his pictures with classical music and opera. The music of Tchaikovsky, Bizet, Smetana, Beethoven, Richard Strauss, and Wagner have all appeared in his films. On occasion, Hertzfeldt has also scored portions of his films himself, with a guitar or keyboard.

Approach to writing

Hertzfeldt described his relaxed writing process in a 2015 Reddit "AMA" session:

In another Reddit "AMA", on the subject of creativity, Hertzfeldt suggested the following:

Student films, 1995–1998
Hertzfeldt made four 16mm animated student films while studying film at the University of California, Santa Barbara.

Ah, L'Amour and Genre were produced at the ages of 18 and 19. Ah, L'Amour won the HBO Comedy Arts Festival Grand Prize for "World's Funniest Cartoon".

His first dialogue short, Lily and Jim, was released in 1997, and tells the story of a disastrous blind date. Its partially improvised vocal performances helped the short win twenty five awards, including the Grand Prize at the New Orleans Film Festival.

His final student cartoon, Billy's Balloon, is about an inexplicable attack on small children by malevolent balloons. It was nominated for the Short Film Palme d'Or at the 1999 Cannes Film Festival, and won the Grand Jury Award at the 1999 Slamdance Film Festival. In total, it won thirty three awards.

The popularity of each student short at film and animation festivals—and eventually around the world from screening on MTV and other networks—helped fund the next one, and eventually financed the production of his first film after college.

Independent animation, 2000–present

Rejected

Soon after graduating from film school, Hertzfeldt purchased his own 35mm rostrum camera and made his next animated short, Rejected.

Released nationwide in theaters through the Spike and Mike's Festival of Animation in 2000, the short won 27 film festival awards and was nominated for an Oscar for Best Animated Short Film the following year. 

Rejected is now considered a cult classic and one of the most influential animated films ever made. In the early 2000s, pirated copies of Rejected turned the film into a viral sensation online, where it has been credited with shaping the surreal sense of humor of the early Internet. In 2018 New York Magazine wrote, "If there is a single piece of media that inspired what we nebulously refer to as “internet humor,” it’s probably Rejected.

In 2009, Rejected was the only short film named as one of the "Films of the Decade" by Salon. In 2010, it was noted as one of the five "most innovative animated films of the past ten years" by The Huffington Post. Indiewire film critic Eric Kohn named Rejected one of the "10 best films of the 21st century" on his list for the BBC Culture poll in 2016.

The film presents itself as a reel of rejected commercial work by a fictional version of Don Hertzfeldt. The commissioned animated vignettes grow more and more abstract and inappropriate as the animator suffers a mental breakdown, until they literally fall apart.

Although the film is fictional and Hertzfeldt has never done advertising work, he received many offers to do television commercials after Billy's Balloon drew international attention. In appearances Hertzfeldt has told the humorous story of how he was tempted to produce the worst possible cartoons he could come up with for the companies, run off with their money, and see if they would actually make it to air. Eventually this became the germ for Rejected'''s theme of a collection of cartoons so bad they were rejected by advertising agencies, leading to their creator's breakdown and ultimately the cartoons' metaphysical crisis.

The Animation Show

In 2003, Hertzfeldt created The Animation Show with Beavis and Butt-head creator Mike Judge. It was a biennial North American touring festival that brought independent animated short films to more movie theaters than any distributor in history. The programs were personally curated by Hertzfeldt and Judge. Highlights of the first theatrical program included a restored excerpt from Ward Kimball's 1957 Mars and Beyond through a special partnership with Disney, the stop-motion animated film Vincent by Tim Burton, new cartoons by Hertzfeldt to book end the program, and never-before-seen pencil tests and animation experiments by Mike Judge.

A second Animation Show edition toured throughout 2005, featuring Hertzfeldt's new short film The Meaning of Life and new work by animators Peter Cornwell and Georges Schwizgebel. The third season of The Animation Show began its nationwide release in January 2007, featuring new work by animators Joanna Quinn and Bill Plympton, as well as Hertzfeldt's Everything Will Be OK.

A stated goal of The Animation Show was to regularly "free the work of these independent artists from the dungeons of Internet exhibition," and bring them into proper movie theaters where most of the short films were originally meant to be seen. The Animation Show meanwhile launched a supplemental DVD series of animated short films, with content that varied from the annual theatrical programs. These DVDs were distributed by MTV.

In a March 2008 entry in his blog, Hertzfeldt announced he had decided to leave The Animation Show, after having programmed three tours. A fourth season of the program was released in theaters in summer 2008, with no involvement from him.

The Meaning of Life

Almost four years in the making, Hertzfeldt's twelve-minute The Meaning of Life premiered at the 2005 Sundance Film Festival and toured film and animation festivals in 2005–2006. Though its abstract nature puzzled some critics, it received mostly positive reviews. The Atlanta Journal-Constitution called the film "the closest thing on film yet to Kubrick's 2001: A Space Odyssey."

In the film, the evolution of the human race is traced from prehistory (mankind as blob forms), through today (mankind as teeming crowds of selfish, fighting, or lost individuals), to hundreds of millions of years into the future as our species evolves into countless new forms; all of them still behaving the same way. The film concludes in the extreme future, with two creatures (apparently an adult and child subspecies of future human), having a conversation about the meaning of life on a colorful shore.

In 2009, Hertzfeldt noted, "I don't often make the same sort of movie twice in a row. It's always been whatever's next in my head. From a commercial standpoint I guess I’ve made some pretty inscrutable decisions, like following up 'Rejected' with a sprawling abstract film about human evolution, but it's really just been whichever ideas won't go away at the time. There's always a lot of new things I’d like to try."

In 2014, Time Out New York named the film one of the "thirty best animated short films ever made."

Everything will be OK, I Am So Proud of You, and It's Such a Beautiful DayEverything Will Be OK was released in 2006 and became Hertzfeldt's most critically successful piece to date, receiving his strongest reviews. The 17-minute animated short was based on a character, Bill, from his webcomic "Temporary Anesthetics". The Boston Globe called the film a "masterpiece" with the Boston Phoenix declaring Hertzfeldt a "genius." The short film was a cover story on the Chicago Reader, receiving four stars from critic J.R. Jones. Variety film critic Robert Koehler named Everything Will Be OK one of the Best Films of 2007.Everything will be OK is the first chapter of a three-part story about a man named Bill whose daily routines, perceptions, and dreams are illustrated onscreen through multiple split-screen windows. Bill's seemingly mundane life, narrated in humorous and dramatic anecdotes, gradually grows dark as we learn he may be suffering from a possibly fatal mental disorder.

Scenes throughout the trilogy are often divided into multiple windows of action on the screen at once against a background of pure black. Animated still photographs are also incorporated inside certain windows, as well as a handful of the colorful special effects and experimental film techniques that Hertzfeldt first utilized in The Meaning of Life. Like many of Hertzfeldt's films, most of the trilogy's special effects were captured in-camera.Everything Will Be OK won the Grand Jury Prize for Short Filmmaking at the 2007 Sundance Film Festival, the Lawrence Kasdan Award for Best Narrative Film at the Ann Arbor Film Festival, the Grand Prize at the London Animation Festival, and 34 other awards.I Am So Proud of You, the second chapter in the story, was released in autumn 2008. Upon its release, Hertzfeldt traveled with I Am So Proud of You and a selection of his other films to 22 cities on a sold-out American tour (with two stops in the UK and three in Canada). '"An Evening with Don Hertzfeldt" presented a 35mm selection of his work followed by an onstage interview and audience chat with him. I Am So Proud of You also played at film festivals throughout 2009 and won 27 awards.

The third and final chapter, It's Such a Beautiful Day, premiered at the 2011 Sundance Film Festival. Hertzfeldt traveled with It's Such a Beautiful Day in 2011 and 2012 on another North American theatrical tour to 30 cities.

Of the trilogy, Steven Pate of The Chicagoist wrote, "There is a moment in each installment of Don Hertzfeldt's masterful trilogy of animated shorts where you feel something in your chest. It's an unmistakably cardiac event, the kind that great art can elicit when something profound and undeniably true is conveyed about the human condition. That's when you say to yourself: are stick figures supposed to make me feel this way? In the hands of a master, yes. And Hertzfeldt is to stick figures what Franz Liszt was to planks of ebony and ivory and what Ted Williams was to a stick of white ash: someone so transcendentally expert that to describe what they do in literal terms is borderline demeaning."

Wisdom Teeth
In October 2009, Hertzfeldt premiered Wisdom Teeth, an unannounced, new five-minute cartoon at the "Evening with Don Hertzfeldt" screening at the Ottawa Animation Festival. It later screened at the Sundance Film Festival in January 2010 and the Fantasia Film Festival in Montreal, where it was awarded a Special Jury Mention. In 2010, it appeared as part of a series on the Showtime Network called "Short Stories".

It's Such a Beautiful Day, the feature film

In 2012, Hertzfeldt edited together the three chapters of his short film trilogy to create a seamless new feature film of the story. His first feature film, the movie shares the same title as the third chapter of the story, It's Such a Beautiful Day, and went into limited release in movie theaters during autumn 2012.

Critic J.R. Jones wrote, "with his humor, darkness, philosophical yearning, and insistence on drawing every line himself, [Hertzfeldt] may be the only legitimate successor to Charles M. Schulz."

The film was subsequently released on DVD as well as on-demand in HD on Vimeo, iTunes, and Netflix.It's Such a Beautiful Day was very well received by film critics. The Los Angeles Film Critics Association named it their runner-up for Best Animated Feature Film of the year, behind Frankenweenie. Indiewire ranked Hertzfeldt the 9th best Film Director of the Year in its annual poll (tied with Wes Anderson), and The A.V. Club film critics ranked the film # 8 on their list of the Best Films of 2012. Slate Magazine named "It's Such a Beautiful Day" their pick for Best Animated Feature Film of 2012.

In the years that followed, the film's status grew. In 2014, Time Out New York ranked It's Such a Beautiful Day #16 on its list of the "100 Best Animated Movies Ever Made," and in 2016, The Film Stage critics ranked the film #1 on their list of "The 50 Best Animated Films of the 21st Century Thus Far." In 2019, The Wrap named It's Such a Beautiful Day the #1 "Best Animated Film of the 2010s." The same year, the Vulture film critics ranked it #12 on their overall list of the "Best Movies of the Decade." In 2021, IGN's CineFix gave it the #1 spot on their "Top 10 Animated Films of All Time" list.It's Such a Beautiful Day was released on Blu-ray in 2015.

In 2021, a remastered version was released on The Criterion Channel.

The Simpsons

In 2014, Hertzfeldt wrote, animated, and directed a surreal and futuristic two-minute "couch gag" for the premiere episode of the 26th season of The Simpsons. It was the longest opening gag in the show's history and was described by Spin Magazine as "mind-melting," and "two of the strangest minutes of television ever to air on a major network during prime time."

The sequence depicts Homer accidentally using a time-traveling remote control that regresses him to his original 1987 character model, then propels him into a distant future incarnation of the show called The Sampsans where he and his family have evolved into grotesque, mindless, catchphrase-spouting creatures. Future Homer sadly remembers past futuristic episodes, in which he still had an emotional connection with Marge and the children. Simpsons producer Al Jean called it "crazier than we thought," and "the most insane one we've ever done."

World of Tomorrow

In January 2015, Hertzfeldt's first digitally-animated short film, World of Tomorrow, premiered at the Sundance Film Festival and won the Grand Jury Prize, his second.  Illustrator Julia Pott performs the voice of the short's lead character,  opposite Hertzfeldt's then-four-year-old niece, who was recorded while drawing and playing.  Her spontaneous, natural vocal reactions and questions were then edited into the story to create her character.

On finally making the leap to digital animation after twenty years of working with pencil and paper, Hertzfeldt joked, "I kind of feel like it’s like a rock band who traditionally was guitar, guitar, guitar and then for their new album, they’re like, we’re going electronic! But [then] they only use Casio keyboards and drum machines... It’s not the cutting edge CG we’re all used to."

Critics were universally positive in their reviews, describing the science fiction film as "one of the most satisfying shorts since Chris Marker's landmark 1962 La Jetee and almost certain to be the highlight of this year's Sundance, full stop," "dazzling, enthralling" and "astonishing."

The film next won Best Animated Short at the SXSW Film Festival. Indiewire called the short film "one of the best films of 2015," and The Dissolve named it "one of the finest achievements in sci-fi in recent memory." The A.V. Club described the film as "visionary" and "possibly the best film of 2015," in spite of its short running time. The Austin Film Critics Association gave Hertzfeldt a Special Honorary Award in recognition of the film.World of Tomorrow was released on-demand on Vimeo in March 2015, simultaneous with its run in film festivals.

At the end of its film festival run, the film won over 40 awards. World of Tomorrow won two Crystal Awards from the Annecy Animation Festival, a Special Jury Award, and the Audience Award. The film also won two awards from the Ottawa International Animation Festival, Best Script and the Audience Award.

In 2016, World of Tomorrow won the animation industry's Annie Award for Best Animated Short Film.

In 2016, World of Tomorrow was nominated for the Academy Award for Animated Short Film at the 88th Academy Awards, Hertzfeldt's second career nomination.

In 2016, Rolling Stone ranked World of Tomorrow # 10 on its list of the "Greatest Animated Movies Ever."

World of Tomorrow Episode Two: The Burden of Other People's ThoughtsWorld of Tomorrow Episode Two premiered in 2017 at Fantastic Fest in Austin and received rare "A+" reviews from Indiewire and Collider, where it was described as "another soulful sci-fi masterpiece." The Daily Beast called it 
"one of the best films of the year... a must-see animated masterpiece."

Hertzfeldt traveled with the film to theaters on a "winter mini-tour" in December 2017. The screenings opened with a surprise new two-minute cartoon, in which an animated Hertzfeldt introduces the program from the caverns of an alien planet.World of Tomorrow Episode Two won the Grand Prize at Montreal's Sommets du cinéma d'animation, an Audience Award at Fantastic Fest, and a Special Jury Award from the London Animation Festival.

In January 2018, the film played opening night at the Sundance Film Festival.

World of Tomorrow Episode Three: The Absent Destinations of David PrimeWorld of Tomorrow Episode Three: The Absent Destinations of David Prime was released on-demand worldwide on October 9, 2020. It was unable to appear in theaters due to the COVID-19 pandemic. In 2021, the film was nominated for an Annie Award for Best Animated Short, Hertzfeldt's 4th career nomination in the category.

Other work
In December 2013, Hertzfeldt released a graphic novel, The End of the World, through independent publisher Antibookclub. The 216-page book was described in his blog as containing many years of leftover film ideas reshaped into an experimental new story: "If the films were albums, I guess these would be the B-sides." In 2019, Random House announced they would be printing a new edition of The End of the World in wide release.

In 2013, Hertzfeldt created a 30-second piece called "Day Sleeper" on an iPad for the National Film Board of Canada. It was animated using their app, a tribute to experimental animator Norman McLaren.

In 2021, Hertzfeldt animated and directed On Memory, a special feature included on the World of Tomorrow: The First Three Episodes Blu-ray.

Hertzfeldt created the animated logo for Jennifer Lawrence's production company, Excellent Cadaver. The logo debuted with the release of Causeway in 2022.

Influence

Hertzfeldt's work has been credited with being a prominent influence on surrealism and absurdism in animation in the 2000s, including shaping Adult Swim's brand of animated comedy.

In 2008, Comedy Central noted his work as having "influenced an entire generation of filmmakers."

In 2012, Hertzfeldt was ranked #16 in an animation industry and historian survey of the "Top 100 Most Influential People in Animation."

An animated science fiction story in the third season of Fargo was an homage to Hertzfeldt's work.

In 2021, Pete Docter acknowledged Hertzfeldt's visual influence on the Pixar film, Soul.

Hertzfeldt has also been noted as an influence among many webcomics, including Hyperbole and a Half, xkcd, and Cyanide and Happiness.

Awards and honors
Hertzfeldt has had more films play in competition at the Sundance Film Festival than any other filmmaker, with eight: Rejected, The Meaning of Life, Everything Will Be OK, I Am So Proud of You, Wisdom Teeth, It's Such a Beautiful Day, World of Tomorrow, and World of Tomorrow Episode Two. He returned to the Sundance Film Festival in 2013 to serve on the Short Film Jury.

In 1999, at the age of 22, Hertzfeldt was nominated for the Short Film Palme d'Or at the Cannes Film Festival for Billy's Balloon, where he was the youngest director in competition. The same year Billy's Balloon won the Slamdance Film Festival Grand Jury Award.

In 2000, at the age of 23, Hertzfeldt was nominated for the Academy Award for Best Animated Short Film for his fifth short film, Rejected. He lost to Michaël Dudok de Wit for Father and Daughter.

In 2001, Hertzfeldt was named by Filmmaker Magazine as one of the "Top 25 Filmmakers to Watch."

In 2002, Hertzfeldt joined the Academy of Motion Picture Arts and Sciences.

In 2007, Hertzfeldt's Everything Will Be OK won the Grand Jury Award for Short Film at the Sundance Film Festival, a prize rarely given to an animated film.

In 2007, according to the animation industry website Cartoon Brew, Everything Will Be OK advanced to the final round of voting as a contender for an Academy Award nomination for Best Animated Short, but did not make the ultimate list of five nominees.

In 2007, Hertzfeldt accepted an invitation from the George Eastman House's motion picture archives to indefinitely store and preserve the original film elements and camera negatives to his collected work.

In 2009, Rejected was the only short film named one of the "Films of the Decade" by Salon.com. In 2010, it was noted as one of the five "most innovative animated films of the past ten years" by The Huffington Post.

In April 2010, at the age of 33, Hertzfeldt received the San Francisco International Film Festival's "Persistence of Vision" Lifetime Achievement Award "for his unique contributions to film and animation," and "for challenging the boundaries of his craft."

Hertzfeldt was the youngest director named in the "They Shoot Pictures, Don't They" list of "The 100 Important Animation Directors" of all time,

In 2012, Hertzfeldt received the Ted M. Larson memorial award from the Fargo Film Festival, for his "contributions to film culture."

In 2015, Hertzfeldt won the Grand Jury Award for Short Film a second time at the Sundance Film Festival, for World of Tomorrow.

In December 2015, Hertzfeldt received a special award from the Austin Film Critics Association, "in celebration of a career of remarkable short filmmaking and contributions to animation spanning two decades, with 2015's award-winning "World of Tomorrow" being recognized as his best work to date."

Hertzfeldt has been nominated for four Annie Awards for Best Animated Short Film. He lost for Rejected in 2001 and Everything Will Be OK in 2007 and won for World of Tomorrow in 2016. World of Tomorrow Episode Three: The Absent Destinations of David Prime was nominated in 2021 and lost.

In 2016, World of Tomorrow was nominated for the Academy Award for Best Animated Short Film at the 88th Academy Awards, Hertzfeldt's second nomination.

DVD and Blu-ray releases

Hertzfeldt owns the rights to all of his work and has self-distributed his films under the moniker "Bitter Films" since the 1990s.

Bitter Films' first DVD release was a 2001 limited edition DVD "single" of the short Rejected. The DVD included a deleted scene, audio commentary, and a few hidden pages. It is now out of print.Don Hertzfeldt Volume One: 1995–2005 was released in 2006, collecting the first 10 years of his work. All of the short films were remastered and restored in high definition from their original film negatives. The DVD was made available only to fans via the Bitter Films website, with the first 750 pre-orderers receiving an "exclusive mystery gift" (either a 35 mm–clipping from Rejected that was autographed by Don, or a unique drawing by Don on a post-it note).

This DVD marked the first time his student films such as Genre and Lily and Jim were made widely available to the public. Many of these works were only previously found on limited-release VHS collections of animated shorts, long out of print.

The special features for Don Hertzfeldt Volume One: 1995–2005 included a time-lapse documentary of the making of The Meaning of Life called "Watching Grass Grow", The Animation Show Trilogy cartoons, Lily and Jim deleted dialogues and outtakes, Rejected trivia captions, The Meaning of Life special effects audio commentary, an over 140-page "archive" section (of rare footage from Hertzfeldt's earliest cartoons, original pencil tests, deleted sequences, abandoned footage, and sketch to scene comparisons), Lily and Jim audio commentary, Rejected audio commentary, and a retrospective booklet, with liner notes by Hertzfeldt.

In 2007, Everything Will Be OK was released as another DVD "single". Special features on this release included over a hundred pages of "archival" material (sketches, storyboards, deleted materials), and a hidden feature that played a narration-free version of the film.I Am So Proud of You was released as a similar "single" in 2009. It featured a similar 148 page "archive" of production materials, as well as the hidden narration-free feature.Don Hertzfeldt Volume 2: 2006–2011, a DVD collection of all work from 2006–2011 (including the feature film version of It's Such a Beautiful Day) was released in November 2012. Special features for the release included over 40 minutes of live Q&A material from the touring program, the cartoon Wisdom Teeth, a deleted scene from It's Such a Beautiful Day, and a 24-page booklet. Advance pre-order customers for the release also received a 35 mm–film strip clipped from a release print of It's Such a Beautiful Day, and other free gifts.

In 2015, Hertzfeldt ran a Kickstarter campaign to help finance future productions, with the Blu-ray debut of It's Such a Beautiful Day and World of Tomorrow as the central pledge reward. The campaign raised over $215,000. With rising pledges he restored and remastered additional short films The Meaning of Life, Rejected, Wisdom Teeth, and student films Billy's Balloon and Lily and Jim, adding them to the Blu-ray as well. Also included on the disc was an interview, his piece from The Simpsons, and the first preview of World of Tomorrow Episode Two.

In 2021, a second fundraiser campaign raised over $450,000 for future productions. The main pledge reward was the Blu-ray release of World of Tomorrow: The First Three Episodes, a collection of the first three World of Tomorrow short films plus a booklet of production notes, a deleted scene, and a related new animated short called On Memory. Other rewards included signed prints, production artwork from It's Such a Beautiful Day, World of Tomorrow jigsaw puzzles, and original drawings.

Since the 1990s, his website Bitter Films has annually auctioned off original animation artwork and props to raise money for local charities. Other artwork has been occasionally given away through the Bitter Films online store through special promotions. Because Hertzfeldt does not often do signings, his artwork is rare for animation collectors and fans to own.

View on advertising
Hertzfeldt has been offered numerous lucrative advertising deals, including ad campaigns for Cingular Wireless and United Airlines, which he has declined. He has made various comments over the years about his dislike of corporate America and says he will never be involved with the advertising world. He has said, "The goal isn't to try and make as much money as I possibly can, the goal is to try and make good movies."

In a 2015 Vanity Fair interview, Hertzfeldt said:

In a March 2009 blog entry, Hertzfeldt compared filmmaking to his love of hiking and exploring new places: something he does just because he "enjoys doing it and will probably always enjoy doing it." He compared doing advertising to being paid to not go explore the woods, but to walk around someone's house eight hours a day wearing a sandwich board with a picture of a product on it. "Money's not the reason I take walks. It doesn't really factor into it. I take walks because I enjoy doing it. It's something I'd do if I was rich, and it's something I'd do if I were poor."

In the commentary for Rejected on the Bitter Films Vol. 1 DVD, Hertzfeldt stated that "You never want to lie to your audience... you can trick them, you can disturb them, you can annoy them, but you can never lie to them. To me commercials are nothing but lies."

Nevertheless, several international ad campaigns have borrowed heavily from his unique style and bear enough resemblance to Hertzfeldt's work as to be mistaken for it. The most well-known instance of this is a series of television ads for Kellogg's Pop-Tarts, which use black and white stick figures, "squiggly" animation, surreal humor, and even an occasional crumpling paper effect, all very similar to Hertzfeldt's style. Despite all these similarities, Hertzfeldt was not involved in any way. In Canada, the not-for-profit corporation Encorp has used a Hertzfeldt-like style of short animation clips on TV and the Internet to promote its "Don't Mess With Karma" campaign to encourage recycling. One of the latest ad campaigns to use an art style similar to Hertzfeldt's is Krystal fast food restaurant to promote their Blitz Energy Drink.

Filmography
 Ah, L'Amour (1995) (student film)
 Genre (1996) (student film)
 Lily and Jim (1997) (student film)
 Billy's Balloon (1998) (student film)
 Rejected (2000)
 Welcome to the Show/Intermission in the Third Dimension/The End of the Show (2003) (cartoons created to book-end the first "Animation Show" program)
 The Meaning of Life (2005)
 Everything Will Be OK (2006)
 I Am So Proud of You (2008)
 Wisdom Teeth (2010)
 It's Such a Beautiful Day (2011)
 It's Such a Beautiful Day (2012) (feature film version)
 The Simpsons (2014) (episode "Clown in the Dumps" two minute couch gag)
 World of Tomorrow (2015)
 World of Tomorrow - Episode Two: The Burden of Other People's Thoughts (2017)
 Intro (2017) (cartoon created to introduce a Hertzfeldt theatrical program)
 World of Tomorrow - Episode Three: The Absent Destinations of David Prime (2020)
 On Memory'' (2021) (Blu-ray animated special feature)

References

External links
  – official site
 
 American Film Institute 2009 interview

American animated film directors
American surrealist artists
Animators from California
Stop motion animators
University of California, Santa Barbara alumni
People from Fremont, California
Artists from California
1976 births
Living people
American people of Swedish descent
People from Castro Valley, California
Annie Award winners
Sundance Film Festival award winners
Postmodernist filmmakers